Jardines de Pando is a suburb of the city of Pando in the Canelones Department of southern Uruguay.

Geography

Location

Population
In 2011 Jardines de Pando had a population of 756.
 
Source: Instituto Nacional de Estadística de Uruguay

References

External links
INE map of Pando, Estanque de Pando, Jardines de Pando and Viejo Molino

Populated places in the Canelones Department